Heffelfinger (meaning: pedigree or person came from Häfelfingen, Switzerland) is a surname, and may refer to:
 Heffelfinger Creek, see List of Minnesota streams

People 
 Chris Heffelfinger, researcher and writer based in Washington, D.C.
 Frank Heffelfinger - see Early history of Minnesota Golden Gophers football
 Jane Heffelfinger, see Manitoba general election, 1969
 Thomas B. Heffelfinger, U.S. Attorney for Minnesota
 Totton Heffelfinger, president of the United States Golf Association, see Hazeltine National Golf Club
 Pudge Heffelfinger (1867 - 1954), American football player

German-language surnames
Swiss-German surnames